Adam Kendrick (born 26 January 1969 in Manchester, Lancashire), also known as Adamo Palladino, is a British actor who has appeared on television and in films.

Filmography
The End of Innocence (1990)
The Outsider (1998)
Garden of Evil (1998)
Extramarital (1999)
The Theory of the Leisure Class (2001)
The Drone Virus (2004)
Boa vs. Python (2004)
29 Reasons to Run (2006)

External links
 

1969 births
Male actors from Manchester
English male film actors
English male television actors
Living people